The 1982 NCAA Division I Outdoor Track and Field Championships were contested May 31−June 5 at the Clarence F. Robison Track and Field Complex at Brigham Young University in Provo, Utah in order to determine the individual and team national champions of men's and, for the first time, women's collegiate Division I outdoor track and field events in the United States. 

These were the 60th annual men's championships and the inaugural women's championships. This was the Cougars' third time hosting the event and the first since 1975. 

UTEP and UCLA topped the men's and women's team standings, respectively; the Miners claimed their sixth overall, and fifth consecutive, team title while the Bruins' claimed their first.

Team results 
 Note: Top 10 only
 (H) = Hosts

Men's title

Women's title

References

NCAA Men's Outdoor Track and Field Championship
NCAA Division I Outdoor Track and Field Championships
NCAA
NCAA Division I Outdoor Track and Field Championships
NCAA Division I Outdoor Track and Field Championships
NCAA Women's Outdoor Track and Field Championship